Steve Miller (born July 31, 1950) is an American science fiction writer from Waterville, Maine, best known for his works set in the Liaden universe, written in collaboration with his wife Sharon Lee.

Background 
Miller was born July 31, 1950 in Baltimore, Maryland. He attended Franklin High School in Reisterstown, Maryland, graduating in 1968; and the University of Maryland, Baltimore County in the late 1960s and 1970s, where he was news editor and managing editor of the campus newspaper, The Retriever and founding president of the Infinity Circle, the school's first science fiction club. He served as founding Curator of the UMBC Albin O. Kuhn Library & Gallery's science fiction research collection. Miller was an active member of science fiction fandom for many years, serving as Director of Information of the Baltimore Science Fiction Society for some years, and as vice-chair of the bid committee to hold the 38th World Science Fiction Convention in Baltimore (they lost to Boston).

Miller married Baltimore-area science fiction fan Sue Nice in 1975; they divorced in 1979. He and Sharon Lee were married in 1980. In 1988, they relocated to central Maine, living for some time in Winslow, Maine. In early 2018, they moved "into town" to nearby Waterville (on the other side of the Kennebec River).

Writing 
In 1973, Miller attended the Clarion West Writers Workshop. He sold short fiction to semi-professional markets, and wrote for science fiction fanzines, before selling a short story, "Charioteer" to Amazing Stories (May 1978 issue). He has since published dozens of novels and over 50 short stories, as well as book reviews, essays and other non-fiction; much (though not all) in collaboration with Lee. He has also collaborated with Lee on some non-Liaden works.

On fan fiction 
Miller and Lee strongly oppose fan fiction written in their universe. In Lee's words:I don't want 'other people interpreting' our characters. Interpreting our characters is what Steve and I do; it's our job.  Nobody else is going to get it right. This may sound rude and elitist, but honestly, it’s not easy for us to get it right sometimes, and we've been living with these characters ... for a very long time ... We built our universes, and our characters; they are our intellectual property; and they are not toys lying about some virtual sandbox for other kids to pick up and modify at their whim.  Steve and I do not sanction fanfic written in our universes; any such work that exists, exists without our permission, and certainly without our support.

Publishing
Miller ran a small press from 1995 through 2012, specializing in chapbooks containing 2-3 short stories set in the Liaden Universe, and other settings from books by him, Sharon Lee and other authors. The works published under this imprint by Miller and Lee have been published as ebooks in editions from Baen Books following the termination of operations of SRM Publishers, Ltd.

Works

Liaden Universe novels 

(coauthored with Sharon Lee)

Agent of Change Sequence
Agent of Change (1988) 
Conflict of Honors (1988)  
Carpe Diem (1989)  
Plan B (1999) 
I Dare (2002) 
Local Custom (2002) 
Scout's Progress (2002) 
Mouse and Dragon (2010) 

Omnibus Editions
Partners in Necessity (Omnibus edition of Agent of Change, Conflict of Honors, and Carpe Diem) (2000) 
Pilot's Choice (Omnibus edition of Local Custom and Scout's Progress) (2001) 
The Dragon Variation (Omnibus edition of Local Custom, Scout's Progress and Conflict of Honors) (2010)  
The Agent Gambit (Omnibus edition of Agent of Change, Carpe Diem) (2011) 
Korval's Game (Omnibus edition of Plan B and I Dare) (2011) 

The Great Migration Duology
Crystal Soldier (2005) 
Crystal Dragon (2006) 
The Crystal Variation (Omnibus edition of Crystal Soldier, Crystal Dragon and Balance of Trade) (20110901)  

Other
Balance of Trade (2004) 
Trade Secret (2013) 
Fledgling (2009) 
Saltation (2010) 
Ghost Ship (2011) 
Dragon Ship (2012) 

Necessity's Child (2014) 

Dragon in Exile (2015) 

Alliance of Equals (2016) 

The Gathering Edge (2017) 

Neogenesis (2018) 

Accepting the Lance (2019) 

Trader's Leap (2020)

Liaden Universe Short Story Collections 
A Liaden Universe Constellation (2013) 
A Liaden Universe Constellation, Volume 2 (2014) 
A Liaden Universe Constellation, Volume 3 (2015) 
A Liaden Universe Constellation, Volume 4 (2019) 
A Liaden Universe Constellation, Volume 5 (2022)

The Fey Duology 
(coauthored with Sharon Lee)
Duainfey
Longeye

Other Novels coauthored with Sharon Lee 
The Tomorrow Log (2003)
The Sword of Orion (2005)

Anthology co-edited with Sharon Lee 
Low Port (2003)

Awards and honors 
Miller (along with Lee) has received various literary awards.

Miller, usually with Lee, has been a Guest of Honor or Special Guest at a number of science fiction conventions, including:
SiliCon (1998); SheVaCon (2000, 2003); Albacon (2002); Balticon and MarsCon (2003); PortConME (2004, 2010); CONduit and Trinoc*coN (2004); Penguicon and COSine (2006); Stellarcon (2009); DucKon and Oasis (2010); and ConQuesT and Chattacon (2012).

References

External links
  (Liad universe, Sharon Lee, and Miller)

Steve Miller in The Encyclopedia of Science Fiction, 3rd ed.
 

1950 births
Living people
American romantic fiction writers
American science fiction writers
Writers from Baltimore
People from Winslow, Maine
Novelists from Maine
American male short story writers
American male novelists
20th-century American novelists
21st-century American novelists
People from Reistertown, Maryland
20th-century American short story writers
21st-century American short story writers
20th-century American male writers
21st-century American male writers
Novelists from Maryland
People from Waterville, Maine